Québec-Montréal is a Canadian comedy film, released in 2002.

Directed by Ricardo Trogi, the film focuses on nine people, all on the cusp of turning 30 and dealing with complex questions about life and love, whose lives intersect on four separate road trips from Quebec City to Montreal along Quebec Autoroute 20. The film's cast includes Patrice Robitaille, Jean-Philippe Pearson, Stéphane Breton, François Létourneau, Isabelle Blais, Benoît Gouin, Marie-Ginette Guay and Julie Le Breton.

The film garnered four Genie Award nominations at the 23rd Genie Awards in 2003, including Best Picture, Best Director, Best Original Screenplay and Best Editing. It won four Jutra Awards at the 5th Jutra Awards, including Best Picture, Best Director, Best Screenplay and Best Supporting Actress (Blais), and was nominated but did not win for Best Actor (Robitaille), Best Supporting Actor (Gouin) and Best Score.

References

External links 

2002 films
2000s French-language films
2002 drama films
Films set in Quebec
Films directed by Ricardo Trogi
Canadian road comedy-drama films
2000s road comedy-drama films
Best Film Prix Iris winners
French-language Canadian films
2000s Canadian films